Lambrama District is one of the nine districts of the  Abancay Province in Peru. It is located at 13° 52' 32" latitude (south) and 72° 46' 19" latitude (west)

Geography 
Other mountains are listed below:

Ethnic groups 
The people in the district are mainly indigenous citizens of Quechua descent. Quechua is the language which the majority of the population (87.87%) learnt to speak in childhood, 11.95% of the residents started speaking using the Spanish language (2007 Peru Census).

References

Districts of the Abancay Province
Districts of the Apurímac Region